The city of Buenos Aires is formally divided in 48 barrios (neighborhoods), grouped into 15 comunas (communes), which are defined as "units of decentralized political and administrative management governed by designated residents".

The city proper (excluding the suburbs and exurbs that form Greater Buenos Aires), had 2,891,082 inhabitants as of 2010.

Overview

Sanitary regions
The borders of the sanitary regions are aligned with the borders of the communes.
 Region 1: C1, C3, C4
 Region 2: C7, C8, C9
 Region 3: C5, C6, C10, C11, C15
 Region 4: C2, C12, C13, C14

References

External links 
Map of Buenos Aires' neighborhoods and communes

Geography of Buenos Aires